Tina Križan (born 18 March 1974) is a former Slovenian professional tennis player.

Known primarily for her achievements playing doubles, as the first Slovenian in the 90' she reached a career-high singles ranking of 95, including a win over Jana Novotna and a career-high doubles ranking of 19 in 2002, including wins over Martina Navratilova, Arantxa Sánchez Vicario, Ana Ivanovic and Flavia Pennetta. She has won 6 WTA doubles titles and has been runner-up in more than 10 WTA doubles events, she has also won 10 ITF tournaments.

Tina represented Slovenia in doubles at the Olympics in 1992, 2000 and 2004 (both latter years partnered with Katarina Srebotnik). She qualified twice for the doubles season end Masters Championships in Munich and Los Angeles.

Tina Križan holds the record for FED CUP appearances for her country, representing Slovenia in 46 ties playing a record 72 matches.

She graduated from Maribor University in 2004.

WTA Tour finals

Doubles 20 (6–14)

ITF finals

Singles Finals (1-0)

Doubles (10–11)

External links
 
 

1974 births
Living people
Slovenian female tennis players
Olympic tennis players of Slovenia
Tennis players at the 2000 Summer Olympics
Tennis players at the 2004 Summer Olympics
Sportspeople from Maribor